Arnas is a Lithuanian masculine given name, often a diminutive of Arnoldas, and may refer to:

Arnas Beručka (born 1997), Lithuanian basketball player
Arnas Butkevičius (born 1992), Lithuanian professional basketball player
Arnas Labuckas (born 1987), Lithuanian basketball player
Arnas Velička (born 1999), Lithuanian professional basketball 

Masculine given names
Lithuanian masculine given names